Data Design System AS (DDS) supplies the construction industry with software tools for building information modelling (BIM).

The company was founded in 1984 in Stavanger, Norway. In 2021, the company merged into Graphisoft. in the Nemetschek Group.

DDS is an active member of buildingSMART. DDS has its headquarters at Stavanger, Norway. Other locations include Oslo and Bergen (both in Norway). DDS has several subsidiaries, among them DDS Building Innovation AS and Data Design System GmbH.

The main product line is tools for building services/MEP (mechanical, electrical, plumbing) engineers.

The company distributes DDScad MEP, mainly in continental Europe from its office in Ascheberg, Germany.

The company also develops software tools for the design and production of timber-frame buildings, DDScad Architect & Construction, from its office in Stavanger.

See also 
 Comparison of CAD editors for AEC
 Comparison of CAD, CAM and CAE file viewers

References

External links 

Building information modeling
Computer-aided design software
Computer-aided design software for Windows
Software companies of Norway
Software companies established in 1984